Anderson Mounds, part of Mounds State Park and, located near Anderson, Indiana,  is a burial site that developed during the Hopewell culture. These earthworks were created as a dedication to the Sun God and Earth Mother. The mounds were used as gathering places for religious ceremonies as well as viewing astronomical alignments. 

The Great Mound is the largest of the ten earthworks in the Mounds State Park, and its construction dates to between 250 and 160 B.C. The three floors of the Great Mound were created by a repeated process that included adding a layer of subsoil, burning the ground, then covering the floor in a layer of powdered white calcite, made from bone, shell, and limestone. This gave the floor a clay consistency as well as deep purple color. Each floor had basins and pits of unknown purposes. Near  the gateway of the mound platform, a large pit was found containing various artifacts. These artifacts included chipped stone, flakes, burned bone, a fragment of shell, fragments of mica, and burned clay chunks. Built above this pit was a log tomb, called so because the floor of the tomb was laid with logs. When excavated, two human burials were found inside the tomb; a 50-year-old adult male, and the redeposited partial remains of a cremated individual. Also, artifacts such as a limestone platform pipe, flakes, fire-cracked rocks, mica fragments, pottery, burned and unburned bone, and seven deer bone awls were found in the tomb. 

100 years after the mound was started, the construction of the Great Mound's platform was started. Although the embankment appears random and irregular, it was carefully crafted. 

The only other aboriginal features on the platform were numerous small post holes encircling the top. These holes most likely held a brush fence erected to hide sacred activities carried out on the platform. After the mound was completed, several more pits were dug, some of them spanning from the surface to the lowest floor. One pit was possibly looted, while two other pits contained human burials. No other artifacts were found in these pits.

When working at the Anderson mounds, archeologists learned that the maps used since the late 1800s; were inaccurate. Research showed that the earthworks had been misrepresented in the map.  This issue is significant since it affects the context of the site.  Archaeological surveys of the park have shown that people have used the land for about 10,000 years, beginning as early as 8000 B.C. and continuing through about 1400 AD.  

Given the thousands of years of use, the high condition of the earthworks is stunning. The earthworks are in pristine condition. Now within the state park, the great challenge is to continue keep them in that condition.  

One of the most known styles is the circular earthwork. There are believed to be 8 in the park, but only 4 are visible today. This feature is the most prominent mound in the park, and is so large that it suggests another mound. But this protrusion is  known as the "small knoll". This area was used for rituals and has been targeted by looters in the past, who caused significant damage to the artifacts and their stratigraphy. These rituals, as Estimates by radiocarbon dating suggest the rituals began around 250 B.C.  Another feature of this site is the fiddle-back enclosure. Although there has been no evidence of astronomical activities here, it marks the spot where the sun sets on the summer solstice.

References

Further reading 

 

Archaeological sites in Indiana